Walk for Iraq is a fundraising movement for providing humanitarian aid to Iraqi people. It began in the United Kingdom in 2007 and has also been active in New Zealand and Canada.

History
Walk for Iraq was initially set up in the United Kingdom to fund life saving activities in Iraq. Due to its success, the movement was later picked up in New Zealand (NZ) and Canada. All the raised funds were donated to the work of well established non-government organizations (NGO's) for Iraqis in need: UK's walk donated the money to the work of the International Committee of the Red Cross (ICRC)and to The Iraqi Orphan Foundation, UK. The NZ walk donated the money to the work of Refugees International for the Iraqi Refugees and UNICEF's emergency relief fund for Iraqi children. Canada's walk donated the money to the Iraq Appeal fund of the Canadian Red Cross and also to UNICEF's emergency relief fund for Iraqi children.

References

External links
Walk for Iraq Home Page
Aljazeera Article on Walk for Iraq
World:bridge - Walk for Iraq

Iraq War
Organizations established in 2007